The Renaissance EP is an EP by American punk rock band MxPx, released in 2001.

Track listing

Trivia
 "Party II" is a sequel song to "Party, My House, Be There" from the band's fourth album, Slowly Going the Way of the Buffalo.

References

2001 EPs
MxPx EPs
Fat Wreck Chords EPs